The 2015–16 Swiss Super League, also known as Raiffeisen Super League for sponsoring purposes, was the 119th season of top-tier football in Switzerland. Basel were the defending champions.

A total of 10 teams competed in the league, the 9 best teams from the 2014–15 season and the 2014–15 Swiss Challenge League champion Lugano.

Teams

Stadia and locations

Personnel and kits

League table

Results

First and Second Round

Third and Fourth Round

Season statistics

Top goalscorers
.

Top assists
.

Awards

Annual awards

References

External links 
 
 
 
Swiss Super League at uefa.com

Swit
Swiss Super League seasons